Sosnovsky (masculine), Sosnovskaya (feminine), or Sosnovskoye (neuter) may refer to:

People
 Vladimir Sosnovsky (1922–1990), Ukrainian artist
 Sergey Sosnovski (b. 1981), Belarusian association football player
 Sergey Sosnovsky (1955–2022), Russian actor
 Adrian Sosnovschi (b. 1977), Moldovan association football player

Places
 Sosnovsky District, several districts in Russia
 Sosnovsky Urban Settlement (or Sosnovskoye Urban Settlement), several municipal urban settlements in Russia
 Sosnovsky (inhabited locality) (Sosnovskaya, Sosnovskoye), several inhabited localities in Russia

Plants
Heracleum sosnowskyi or Sosnowskyi Hogweed, a flowering plant in the family Apiaceae

See also
Sosnovo
Sosnovka